Breanne Nalder (born October 2, 1984) is an American professional racing cyclist. She rode in the women's team time trial at the 2015 UCI Road World Championships.

References

External links
 

1984 births
Living people
American female cyclists
Place of birth missing (living people)
21st-century American women